Dysprosium(III) hydroxide is an inorganic compound with the chemical formula Dy(OH)3.

Chemical properties
Dysprosium(III) hydroxide reacts with acids and produces dysprosium(III) salts:
 Dy(OH)3 + 3 H+ → Dy3+ + 3 H2O
Dysprosium(III) hydroxide decomposes to DyO(OH) at elevated temperatures. Further decomposition produces Dy2O3. The reactions are:
 {Dy(OH)_3} ->[299.8\ \text{°C}] {DyOOH} + {H_2O}
 {2 DyOOH} ->[386.6\ \text{°C}] {Dy_2O_3} + {H_2O}

References

Dysprosium compounds
Hydroxides